Sauce lyonnaise is a compound or small French sauce of demi-glace, white wine, vinegar and onions served with small cuts of meat principally for left-overs.

See also
 Lyonnaise cuisine
 Lyonnaise potatoes

References

French sauces
Cuisine of Lyon